The 1st Independent Company Loyal Virginians was an infantry company that served in the Union Army during the American Civil War.

Service
The 1st Independent Company was organized at Cobb's Island in Virginia on June 30, 1864.

The company was mustered out on December 1, 1865.

Commanders
Robert Hamilton was elected Captain by the company along with Adam Garrison as First Lieutenant and Thomas McQuown as Second Lieutenant.

See also
List of Union Virginia Civil War units
West Virginia Units in the Civil War
West Virginia in the Civil War

References

The Civil War Archive

Units and formations of the Union Army from West Virginia
1864 establishments in Virginia
Military units and formations established in 1864
Military units and formations disestablished in 1865